The Pretenders is an English-American rock band from Hereford. Formed in 1978, the group originally consisted of vocalist and rhythm guitarist Chrissie Hynde, lead guitarist and keyboardist James Honeyman-Scott, bassist Pete Farndon, and drummer Martin Chambers. The band's current lineup includes Hynde and Chambers alongside bassist Nick Wilkinson (since 2005), lead guitarist James Walbourne, pedal steel guitarist Eric Heywood (both since 2008) and keyboardist Carwyn Ellis (since 2017).

History
The Pretenders were formed in the spring of 1978 by Chrissie Hynde, James Honeyman-Scott, Pete Farndon and Martin Chambers. After the release of Pretenders in 1980 and Pretenders II in 1981, Farndon was fired from the band on 14 June 1982 due to increasing problems with drug abuse, which had led to Honeyman-Scott claiming he would leave if the bassist was not dismissed. Only two days later, however, Honeyman-Scott died as a result of heart failure brought on by a cocaine overdose. Farndon himself would die by drowning in his bathtub after overdosing on heroin a year later. On 20 July, Hynde and Chambers began recording the single "Back on the Chain Gang", written in tribute to Honeyman-Scott, with session musicians Billy Bremner (lead guitar), Robbie McIntosh (rhythm guitar) and Tony Butler (bass). The single was released in October, and later featured on the 1984 album Learning to Crawl.

In February 1983, The Pretenders returned with McIntosh and bassist Malcolm Foster. Learning to Crawl was released in 1984, after which the band remained largely inactive for a year (save for an appearance at Live Aid) as Hynde married Simple Minds frontman Jim Kerr and gave birth to daughter Yasmin. The group returned in early 1986 to record Get Close, but shortly after sessions began Chambers was fired by Hynde due to a deterioration in his drumming ability, which also led to Foster leaving. Chambers and Foster were replaced by Blair Cunningham and T. M. Stevens, respectively, who completed the album's recording and remained for its 1987 tour (keyboardist Bernie Worrell also joined at the same time). Shortly after beginning the tour, however, Hynde dismissed Stevens and Worrell and brought back Rupert Black (who had toured since Learning to Crawl) and Foster, who remained for the rest of the year. Johnny Marr replaced McIntosh in late 1987, before the band went on hiatus.

Hynde returned in 1990 with Packed!, which was credited to The Pretenders only to fulfil a contractual obligation – Hynde was the only credited band member on the album, although Cunningham performed drums on all eleven tracks. In 1993 the band contributed a Jimi Hendrix cover of Bold As Love for the Hendrix tribute album Stone Free.  A new full lineup of the band was formed in 1993 when Hynde enlisted guitarist Adam Seymour and, later, bassist Andy Hobson and returning drummer Chambers for Last of the Independents, released in 1994. Zeben Jameson was added as touring keyboardist, and the lineup of The Pretenders remained constant for more than ten years. Hobson was replaced by Nick Wilkinson in 2005, and in 2008 Seymour was replaced by James Walbourne and pedal steel guitarist Eric Heywood, both of whom first featured on Break Up the Concrete.

Members

Current

Former

Touring

Timeline

Lineups

References

External links
The Pretenders official website
Pretenders 977 Radio

 
Pretenders, The